Ho Che Anderson is a cartoonist and comics artist primarily affiliated with Fantagraphics.

Biography
Anderson was born in London to “a Jamaican immigrant who named his son after North Vietnamese leader Ho Chi Minh and Cuban Communist revolutionary Che Guevara.”

Anderson was one of the creators to submit ideas when Fantagraphics put out a call for adult comics and the submission became I Want to Be Your Dog.

He wrote, designed, and illustrated a series of comic books on Martin Luther King Jr. in 1993, wrote the 1996 Wise Son: The White Wolf miniseries for Milestone Comics, and started his Scream Queen series in 2010 at Fantagraphics.

Notes

References

 
 
 Ho Che Anderson at the Lambiek Comiclopedia

External links
 
 Anderson page at Fantagraphics' home page.

Date of birth missing (living people)
Living people
American Splendor artists
British comics artists
Canadian comics artists
Fantagraphics
1969 births